Meiler a Búrc, aka Meiler De Burgh was an Irish priest in the later 1500s, and the first recorded Anglican Archdeacon of Clonfert.

References

Archdeacons of Clonfert
16th-century Irish Anglican priests
Christian clergy from County Galway